Vincent Louis Promuto (June 8, 1938 – June 1, 2021) was an American professional football player who was a guard for the Washington Redskins in the National Football League (NFL). He was later a Drug Enforcement Administration official.

Early life
Vincent Promuto was born on June 8, 1938, in New York City, and grew up in the Pelham Bay section of The Bronx.

Career
Promuto played college football at the College of the Holy Cross and was then drafted by the Redskins in the fourth round in the 1960 NFL Draft. He was a guard in the National Football League for the Washington Redskins from 1960 to 1970.  He played 130 games in his career, all with Washington. He was a Pro Bowl selection in 1963 and 1964. He is a member of the Washington Redskins Ring of Fame.

Promuto subsequently worked for the Drug Enforcement Administration (USDEA). He died of congestive heart failure on June 1, 2021, in Pompano Beach, Florida, one week before his 83rd birthday.

References

1938 births
2021 deaths
Players of American football from New York City
American football offensive guards
College of the Holy Cross alumni
Eastern Conference Pro Bowl players
Washington Redskins players
Holy Cross Crusaders football players
Drug Enforcement Administration personnel